Rudolf (Rudi) Jahn (4 November 1906 – 30 September 1990) was a German politician (KPD, SED) and Minister-President of Brandenburg (1949–1952). He was born in Leipzig.

1906 births
1990 deaths
Politicians from Leipzig
People from the Kingdom of Saxony
Communist Party of Germany politicians
Socialist Unity Party of Germany politicians
Members of the Provisional Volkskammer
Members of the 1st Volkskammer
Free German Trade Union Federation members
Ambassadors of East Germany to Bulgaria
Ministers-President of Brandenburg
International Lenin School alumni
Communists in the German Resistance
People condemned by Nazi courts
Buchenwald concentration camp survivors
Recipients of the Patriotic Order of Merit in gold